Dorcadion lodosi is a species of beetle in the family Cerambycidae. It was described by Sabbadini and Pesarini in 1992.

Subspecies
 Dorcadion lodosi abanozense Bernhauer & Peks, 2010
 Dorcadion lodosi lodosi Sabbadini & Pesarini, 1992

References

lodosi
Beetles described in 1992